The Manildra Group is an Australian agribusiness based in Sydney. It was formed in 1952 when Jack Honan purchased a flour mill in Manildra. In 1966 a starch and gluten plant was established in Auburn. In the early 1970s, further starch plants opened in Bomaderry and Devonport, Tasmania, a glucose plant in Bomaderry and a flour mill in Gunnedah purchased.

In 1985 the Auburn plant closed with operations transferred to Bomaderry. In 1991, Ethanol production commenced in Bomaderry. In July 2014, Manildra diversified into meat production with the purchase of an abattoir in Cootamundra.

In 2021, Manildra was ranked 29th on FoodTalks' Top Global Specialty Oil Company list.

References

Agriculture companies of Australia
1952 establishments in Australia